Ellida is a genus of moths of the family Notodontidae erected by Augustus Radcliffe Grote in 1876.

Species
Ellida viridimixta (Bremer, 1861)
Ellida branickii (OberthÜr, 1880)
Ellida arcuata Alpheraky, 1897
Ellida ornatrix Schintlmeister & Fang, 2001
Ellida caniplaga (Walker, 1856)

References

Notodontidae